12 o'clock usually refers the time as shown on a 12-hour clock, either noon - 12 o'clock at daytime - or midnight - 12 o'clock at nighttime.

12 o'clock may also refer to:

 12-hour clock, a time convention in which the 24 hours of the day are divided into two periods
 Noon, 12 o'clock in the daytime, as opposed to midnight
 Midnight, the transition time from one day to the next
The corresponding clock position, straight ahead or directly above
 12 O'Clock (film), a 1958 Bollywood film 
 12 'O' Clock (film) a 2020 Bollywood film
 12 O'Clock (rapper), a Wu-Tang Clan affiliate and MC
 12:00 (Loona EP), 2020
 Twelve O'Clock Point, a community in Quinte West, Ontario, Canada
 "12 O'Clock" (in two parts), a song by Vangelis from Heaven and Hell

See also
 Twelve O'Clock High, a 1949 American war film about aircrews in the United States Army's Eighth Air Force
 Twelve O'clock Knob (Roanoke County, Virginia), a mountain located in southwestern Roanoke County, Virginia

Date and time disambiguation pages